SA Haque Olike is a Bangladeshi film director, screenwriter and Composer. In the late of nineties, he debuted as a director with the drama on the TV screen. Recently released his 5th directed film Golui.

Career

Films

Drama

Acting

References

External links
 

Living people
Bengali film directors
Bangladeshi film directors
Bangladeshi theatre directors
Year of birth missing (living people)
Bangladeshi screenwriters